Ibexaspis is a genus of trilobites in the order Phacopida (family Pliomeridae), that existed during the lower Ordovician in what is now the United States. It was described by Pribyl and Vanek in 1985, and the type species is Ibexaspis quattuor, which was originally described under the genus Protopliomerops as the subspecies P. quattuor brevis by Young in 1973. The type locality was the Fillmore Formation in Utah.

References

External links
 Ibexaspis at the Paleobiology Database

Pliomeridae
Phacopida genera
Fossil taxa described in 1985
Ordovician trilobites
Fossils of the United States